Revenge is the fifth studio album by British pop duo Eurythmics, released on 29 June 1986 by RCA Records in the United Kingdom and on 14 July in the United States. Following on from their previous album, Be Yourself Tonight, Revenge continued further in this direction as the duo embraced a more "rock band" style. The album spawned four singles and was a commercial success. The fourth and final single, "Missionary Man", won the 1987 Grammy Award for Best Rock Performance by a Duo or Group with Vocal. Its release was supported by an extensive world tour. A 1987 concert from the Australian leg of the tour was also released on home video as Eurythmics Live.

On 14 November 2005, Sony BMG released remastered versions of each of Eurythmics' eight studio albums, containing bonus tracks and remixes. The bonus track "Revenge 2" is a radically different remake of "Revenge", the closing track of the duo's 1981 debut album In the Garden. A line from the song ("She said revenge can be so sweet") is also heard at the end of "A Little of You".

Track listing

Personnel
Credits adapted from the liner notes of Revenge.

Eurythmics
 Annie Lennox – vocals
 David A. Stewart – guitar ; vocals

Additional personnel
 Patrick Seymour – keyboards
 Clem Burke – drums
 Jimmy "Z" Zavala – harmonica ; saxophone 
 Jannick Top – bass guitar 
 Joniece Jamison – backing vocals 
 Michael Kamen – orchestra arrangement, conducting 
 John McKenzie – bass guitar 
 Bernita Turner – backing vocals 
 Phil Chen – bass guitar 
 Jon Bavin – additional keyboards 
 Gully – synthesiser guitar noise

Technical
 David A. Stewart – production
 Jon Bavin – recording engineering, mixing engineering
 Manu Guiot – mixing engineering
 Fred Defaye – first assistant engineer
 Serge Pauchard – second assistant engineer

Artwork
 Eric Scott – sleeve paintings
 Laurence Stevens – sleeve designs

Charts

Weekly charts

Year-end charts

Decade-end charts

Certifications

References

Bibliography

 

1986 albums
Albums produced by David A. Stewart
Eurythmics albums
RCA Records albums